Gubernatorial elections in 2002 took place in twelve regions of the Russian Federation.

Race summary

Krasnoyarsk Krai

Background 
From June 1998, Alexander Lebed was the governor of Krasnoyarsk Krai. On 22 April 2002 he died in a helicopter crash. Nikolay Ashlapov became interim governor until the new gubernatorial elections were held in September 2002.

A total of 32 people submitted documents, 16 of them were registered. Later, the Head of Khakassia and the brother of the late governor, Alexei Lebed, withdrew and another candidate was removed from the ballot by the election authorities. Thus, 14 candidates participated in the elections.

The elections were held in two rounds. In the first round, none of the candidates managed to gain more than 50% of the vote. Alexander Uss came the first, gaining 27.6% of the votes, Alexander Khloponin was second with 25%. Sergei Glazyev and Pyotr Pimashkov received fewer votes and did not qualify for the second round.

Results

Aftermath 
On 29 September 2002, a week after the second round, the electoral commission of Krasnoyarsk Krai declared elections invalid following numerous complaints from the headquarters of the losing candidate Alexander Uss. The commission considered that the free vote was impeded by the use of administrative resources by candidates, bribery and deception of voters, spread of fake agitation materials and spending the campaign funds for another purposes. It was also announced at the meeting that it is not possible to determine the vote of about 200,000 people.

Alexander Uss said that for him "the election is over" and he does not intend to participate in re-vote, scheduled in March 2003, he is not going to go to court and advises Khloponin to do the same. Uss also stated that "it is high time to stop electing governors by open ballot and henceforth appoint them directly from the Kremlin". On the same day, the leader of the Liberal Democratic Party, Vladimir Zhirinovsky, came up with a similar idea, even saying that LDPR was recalling their representative from the Central Election Commission, stating that the entire Russian electoral system is so rotten that a decent person will no longer get involved with it.

On 1 October the court ruled that the decision of the regional electoral commission to annul the results was unauthorized and, in fact, officially recognized that Khloponin became the winner. Two days later, the regional election commission complied with the court's decision, however, filing a cassation appeal against it. On the same day, Russian president Vladimir Putin signed a decree, appointing Khloponin the acting governor of Krasnoyarsk Krai. His inauguration was held on October 17. Month later, on November 19, 2002, the Supreme Court of Russia rejected the cassation appeal of the election commission of Krasnoyarsk Krai and confirmed the legality of the election of Alexander Khloponin as the governor.

References

Gubernatorial elections in Russia
2002 elections in Russia